"When I Get Old" is a song by the American punk rock band the Descendents, released as the second single from their 1996 album Everything Sucks. The single also includes "Sick-O-Me" from the album and "Gotta", a B-side written by and featuring the band's original bassist Tony Lombardo.

The music video for "When I Get Old" was directed by Dave Robinson. It depicts the band performing the song in a house full of fans, interspersed with footage of the band members riding bicycles and flip book animations of the band's Milo caricature acting out themes from the song's lyrics.

Track listing

Personnel 

Band
Milo Aukerman – vocals
Stephen Egerton – guitar, producer, engineer, mixing of "Gotta"
Karl Alvarez – bass guitar on "When I Get Old" and "Sick-O-Me"
Bill Stevenson – drums, producer, engineer, mixing of "Gotta"

Additional musicians
Chad Price – backing vocals
Tony Lombardo – bass guitar on "Gotta"

Production
Jason Livermore – additional engineering
Andy Wallace – mixing of "When I Get Old" and "Sick-O-Me"
Steve Sisco – assistant mix engineer
Howie Weinberg – mastering

References 

1997 singles
Descendents songs
Epitaph Records singles
1996 songs